Very Old Pretenders is a comedy mockumentary on BBC Radio 4 which was first broadcast between 15 September and 6 October 2011.

Plot
A fictional anthropologist discover two Jacobite soldiers, preserved alive in a cave since 1745, and introduces them to modern life.

Production
Very Old Pretenders was written by Carl Gorham, known to British audiences for his earlier Gorham and Swift radio sitcom and the television series Stressed Eric.  It was produced by Absolutely Productions.

Reception
Initial reviews (from advance copies sent to critics) were positive, Ron Hewit in the Radio Times calling it "terrific", and Gillian Reynolds in the Telegraph suggested it was very funny if, along with her, one likes "Scotsmen plus a bustling conjunction of the real with the surreal".

Episodes

Series 1

References

External links
Production website featuring cast and crew: http://www.absolutely.biz/very-old-pretenders-key-cast-and-crew

BBC Radio comedy programmes
2011 radio programme debuts
BBC Radio 4 programmes